Michael Joseph O'Higgins (1 November 1917 – 9 March 2005) was an Irish Fine Gael politician who served as Leader of the Seanad from 1973 to 1977. He served as a Teachta Dála (TD) from 1948 to 1951 and 1954 to 1969. He also served as a Senator from 1951 to 1954 and 1973 to 1977. 

The son of prominent Fine Gael politician Thomas F. O'Higgins, Michael and his brother Tom both entered the Dáil in 1948 and served there for a number of decades. While Tom built a reputation as a liberal, Michael mirrored their father and was considered a conservative.

Biography

Early life
O'Higgins was born in Straffan, County Kildare, in 1917. O'Higgins came from an Irish political family. His father was Thomas F. O'Higgins, a former leader of the Blueshirts and cabinet minister. His uncle was Kevin O'Higgins, the assassinated cabinet minister from the 1920s. O'Higgins's brother was Tom O'Higgins, a fellow TD, Minister, presidential candidate (in 1966 and 1973) and later Chief Justice of Ireland.

As a teenager, O'Higgins was a member of the Blueshirts, the radical right-wing paramilitary that emerged in the early 1930s in Ireland in opposition to the Irish Republican Army. Speaking at a Fine Gael convention in Monaghan in 1956, O'Higgins defended his time in the organisation, stating "if it should be necessary to wear it again, I would be proud and glad to wear it. Those who wore the blue shirts did not do so to cause disturbance or strife but in order to bring the various sections of the people together".    

He was educated at St Mary's College, Dublin, Clongowes Wood College, University College Dublin and the Incorporated Law Society of Ireland.

Political career
O'Higgins was first elected to Dáil Éireann as a Fine Gael TD for the Dublin South-West constituency at the 1948 general election. O'Higgins, his father, and his brother hold the distinction of all being elected members of the 13th Dáil in 1948. 

He lost his seat at the 1951 general election, but regained it again at the 1954 election. O'Higgins retained his seat, representing the Wicklow constituency from the 1961 general election onwards, until losing it at the 1969 general election. He was a member of Dublin City Council from 1945 to 1955, and a member of Seanad Éireann from 1951 to 1954 and from 1969 to 1977, until he retired from politics. He served as Leader of the Seanad from 1973 to 1977.

In 1965, when the Leader of Fine Gael James Dillon stepped down, O'Higgins moved immediately to nominate Liam Cosgrave as the new leader in order to prevent the left-wing of the party, centring around the upstart Declan Costello, any time to organise their own campaign for the position. 

During the 1970s O'Higgins opposed any attempts to legalise the sale of contraceptives (birth control) in Ireland.

Personal life
He was married to Brigid Hogan-O'Higgins, also a Fine Gael TD. He married Brigid Hogan in 1958, one year after her election. They were the first married couple ever to be elected to the same Dáil. They had nine children. He died in 2005.

See also
Families in the Oireachtas

References

1917 births
2005 deaths
Fine Gael TDs
Fine Gael senators
Members of the 12th Seanad
Members of the 13th Dáil
Members of the 13th Seanad
Members of the 15th Dáil
Members of the 16th Dáil
Members of the 17th Dáil
Members of the 18th Dáil
Members of the 7th Seanad
Members of the Blueshirts
Nominated members of Seanad Éireann
People educated at Clongowes Wood College
Politicians from County Kildare
Spouses of Irish politicians
Alumni of University College Dublin
People educated at St Mary's College, Dublin